Pilosocereus robinii is a species of cactus known by the common name Key tree-cactus. It is native to the Florida Keys in the United States. It also occurs in Western Cuba and the Northern Bahamas. It has been erroneously reported from Puerto Rico, the Virgin Islands, and Mexico. It is a rare species which is threatened by the loss of its habitat. It is a federally listed endangered species of the United States.

Description
This is a large cactus growing erect, often with many parallel or spreading branches. The stem is green in color with a blue tinge when young and has 9 to 13 ribs. The areoles are covered in long or short hairs and have up to 31 spines each. The spines are no more than a centimeter long. The outer tepals are greenish with brownish midstripes and the inner tepals are white. The flower has a scent similar to garlic. It opens at night and contains a sweet nectar.

Taxonomy
The taxonomy of the species and other Pilosocereus has only been cleared recently. This species was formerly included in the description of Pilosocereus polygonus.

Habitat
This cactus grows in upland tropical hardwood hammocks on limestone or coral substrates. It sometimes grows on sparsely vegetated coral rock and just above the high tide mark. There are only 4 of these plants that produce fruits. Their seeds are dispersed by frugivores. Windy conditions would also spread this cactus' seeds; the wind would break off branches and allow propagation to occur. The branches would root themselves in the soil and stems would grow out from them. Storm surges and sea level rise may inundate its shoreline habitat and increase the salinity beyond the tolerable range for the cactus.

Conservation
Other threats to the species include the destruction of its habitat during development. Populations on the Upper and Lower Matecumbe Keys have been mostly eliminated due to residential development. Development also leads to habitat fragmentation. Hurricanes are a threat to the cactus because the winds can break cactus branches or bring down taller vegetation, causing injury; however, hurricane action may open the canopy, providing sunlight to the cactus, which may be beneficial. As of 2009 there are seven known populations of this plant in Florida, located on four of the Florida Keys.

References

Goodman, Joie, et al. “Differential Response to Soil Salinity in Endangered Key Tree Cactus: Implications for Survival in a Changing Climate.” PLoS ONE, vol. 7, no. 3, 2012, https://doi.org/10.1371/journal.pone.0032528.

External links

USDA Plants Profile for Pilosocereus robinii

robinii
Cacti of North America
Cacti of Mexico
Cacti of the United States
Flora of the Caribbean
Flora of Florida
Flora of Puerto Rico
Critically endangered flora of the United States
Critically endangered biota of Mexico
Critically endangered flora of North America
Plants described in 1957